This is a list of films produced by the Cinema of Andhra Pradesh in the Telugu language based in Hyderabad, India in the year 1982.

Dubbed films

References

1982
Telugu
Telugu films